Sheung Shan Kai Wat is a village in Ta Kwu Ling, North District, Hong Kong.

Administration
Shan Kai Wat is a recognized village under the New Territories Small House Policy.

See also
 Ha Shan Kai Wat

References

External links
 Delineation of area of existing village Sheung Shan Kai Wat (Ta Kwu Ling) for election of resident representative (2019 to 2022)

Villages in North District, Hong Kong